Boeuf Creek is a stream in Franklin and Gasconade counties in the U.S. state of Missouri. Boeuf Creek is a tributary to the Missouri River. Alternate names include Buffalo Creek, Beef Creek, Boeuse Creek, Riviere au Boeuf and variations.

Boeuf Creek was named for the buffalo cows in the area, "boeuf" being a word derived from the French meaning "cattle".

See also
List of rivers of Missouri

References

Rivers of Franklin County, Missouri
Rivers of Gasconade County, Missouri
Rivers of Missouri